In Central Asian countries such as Uzbekistan, Turkmenistan and Tajikistan, and as well as Afghanistan the tunic and loose trousers ensemble forms part of traditional costume. Men will wear turbans or hats with their tunics and sirwals whilst women will wear scarves or hats.

Lozim and kuylak

Men in Central Asian Uzbekistan traditionally wear the sirwal known as lozim in which is wide. Over the lozim, women wear dresses known as kuylak which are generally full sleeved and fall to below the knees but some can be long dresses. A head scarf is traditionally worn over the head which is tied at the back of the neck. Some women also use a second scarf.

Lozim and chakmon

Men of Uzbekistan wear the lozim with a long robe called the chakmon.

Izor and kurta

Women in Tajikistan also wear dresses which are long robes called kurta with sirwal called izor (also referred to as sharovary) tied at the ankles. The ankle gathers are tied with a cord. Head scarfs are also worn.

Balaq and koynak
	
The dress of women of Turkmenistan consists of under trousers called balaq, a dress called koynak and a headdress.

See also 
 Islamic clothing
 Parthian dress
 Persian clothing
 Clothing in Afghanistan
 Saka clothing
 Sasanian dress
 Scythian clothing
 Sogdian clothing
 Tocharian clothing
 Uyghur clothing

References
 

Turkmenistan culture
Tajikistani culture
Uzbekistani culture
Arabic clothing
Middle Eastern clothing
Islamic male clothing